Santa Clara Vanguard Drum and Bugle Corps is a competitive drum and bugle corps, based in Santa Clara, California. The Santa Clara Vanguard is one of the thirteen founding member corps of Drum Corps International (DCI) and a seven time DCI World Champion, winning the title most recently in 2018.

History
 
In March 1967, citing differences of opinion in the artistic direction of the Sparks Drum and Bugle Corps, its parents support group voted to return the corps to its former activity as a drum and lyre corps with majorettes. After the vote, three adults took members aside and asked them if they would prefer to continue as a drum and bugle corps or to return to a drum and lyre corps. After the members chose a drum and bugle corps, their parents immediately started a new booster club to support the new corps. They waited until its members met for rehearsal the following week to select a name. After discussing and rejecting several possible names, the corps chose Santa Clara Vanguard. Gail Royer, a local elementary school music teacher and instructor for the Sparks, was named as the director for the new corps.

In 1968, the corps embarked on its first tour to the Midwest. Although they did not place high at any of the competitions, the tour was a success because of the experience and exposure to the national drum corps scene. The corps also won its first field show that year in August 1968, at the Anaheim Kingsmen's Festival of Music. Santa Clara Vanguard capped off its year by winning the first of many California State Open Championships.

In 1971, the Blue Stars, Cavaliers, Madison Scouts, Santa Clara Vanguard, and the Troopers formed the Midwest Combine. This action was taken in reaction to the rigid rules of the American Legion and VFW and the low or nonexistent performance fees paid for appearing in the various competitions. The corps felt that not only were they having their creative potential as artistic performing groups stifled, but they were being financially starved. A similar group of eastern corps, the United Organization of Junior Corps (also known as the "Alliance"), was formed by the 27th Lancers, Garfield Cadets, Boston Crusaders, Blessed Sacrament Golden Knights, and Blue Rock. The Combine members felt that the corps should be making their own rules, operating their own competitions and championships, and keeping the bulk of the proceeds that those shows earned. For the 1971 season, the corps stuck together, offering show promoters the five corps as a package. Despite pressure on show sponsors, judges, and other drum corps, the Combine was a success.

In 1972, the Santa Clara Vanguard, along with the nine other corps from the Midwest Combine and the Alliance, plus the Anaheim Kingsmen, Argonne Rebels, and De La Salle Oaklands were the founding members of Drum Corps International. At the first DCI World Championships in Whitewater, Wisconsin, Santa Clara Vanguard finished in third place.  Santa Clara would remain among DCI's top three corps for the organization's first eight years, winning the World Championships in 1973, 1974, 1978.

Santa Clara Vanguard won its fourth DCI World Championship in 1981. Over the next seven years, Santa Clara Vanguard never placed below third before winning its fifth DCI title in 1989.  They won their sixth DCI World Championship in 1999 and their seventh in 2018. Since Drum Corps International's founding in 1972, Santa Clara Vanguard has been the only corps to appear as a finalist in every World Championship.

In December 2022, Vanguard Music & Performing Arts announced that the Santa Clara Vanguard Drum & Bugle Corps would be placed on hiatus for the 2023 season due to multiple financial issues from the previous season.

Show summary (1972–2023) 
Source:

Caption awards
At the annual World Championship Finals, Drum Corps International (DCI) presents named awards to the corps with the high average scores from prelims, semifinals, and finals in five captions. Santa Clara Vanguard has won these caption awards. 
 
Don Angelica Best General Effect Award
 2018
 
John Brazale Best Visual Performance Award
 2018
 
George Zingali Best Color Guard Award
 2017
 
Jim Ott Best Brass Performance Award
  2018
 
Fred Sanford Best Percussion Performance Award
 2004, 2014, 2016, 2017, 2018, 2019
 
Prior to 2000 and the adoption of the current scoring format, Santa Clara Vanguard won these captions:
 
High General Effect Award
 1972, 1973, 1974 (tie), 1975, 1978, 1987, 1989, 1999
High Visual Award
 1977, 1981, 1984 (tie), 1985, 1987 (tie)
High Color Guard Award
 1974, 1978 (tie), 1981
High Brass Award
 1984 (3 way tie), 1987 (tie)
High Percussion Award
 1973, 1974, 1975, 1978, 1979, 1988, 1989, 1991 (3 way tie), 1998

Vanguard Cadets Drum and Bugle Corps 

The Santa Clara Vanguard Cadets Drum Corps, also known as the Vanguard Cadets, is an Open Class competitive junior drum corps. Based in Santa Clara, California, the corps is a member of Drum Corps International (DCI) and is the feeder corps for the Santa Clara Vanguard Drum and Bugle Corps.

The Santa Clara Vanguard Cadets were formed in 1971 as a cadet feeder and training corps for the Santa Clara Vanguard. They began as a parade corps, but by the end of the 1970s, the Vanguard Cadets had become a truly competitive Class A corps. The corps did its first major touring in 1990, and in 1991, they attended their first DCI World Championships in Dallas. In 1993, the corps became the first cadet corps to achieve DCI membership. In 2000, the Vanguard Cadets became the first feeder corps to win a championship in Division II (now Open Class). The corps also qualified for the Division I (now World Class) Semifinals. Despite their cadet status, the Vanguard Cadets won their division in 2000, 2008, 2013, 2015, 2017, 2018, and 2022.

In September 2018, Vanguard Music & Performing Arts, BD Performing Arts, and Drum Corps International announced that the Vanguard Cadets would "be restructured as a California-based drum corps" and that both the Vanguard Cadets and the Blue Devils B Drum and Bugle Corps would not attend DCI Open Class Championships in 2019.

In September 2022, Vanguard Music & Performing Arts announced that the Vanguard Cadets Drum & Bugle Corps will be placed on hiatus for the 2023 season due to multiple unforeseen financial issues that faced both Vanguard corps during the previous season.

Show summary (1982–2023) 
Source:

References

External links
 

Drum Corps International World Class corps
Culture of Santa Clara, California
Musical groups established in 1967
1967 establishments in California